Gelgia (Romansh) is a river in the Grisons canton, eastern Switzerland. It is a tributary of the Albula, which it meets in Tiefencastel. The road to the Julier Pass runs through the Sursés, like the major valley of the Gelgia and its side valleys are called.

Rivers of Switzerland
Rivers of Graubünden
Albula/Alvra
Surses